Laugh Bomb (Swedish: Skrattbomben) is a 1954 Swedish comedy film directed by Börje Larsson and starring Gus Dahlström, Holger Höglund and Karl-Arne Holmsten. It was shot at the Centrumateljéerna Studios in Stockholm. The film's sets were designed by the art director Nils Nilsson.

Synopsis
Two men working at a research laboratory invent a new bomb that can induce laughter, but it is stolen before they can display it to their superiors and they set out to recover it.

Cast
 Gus Dahlström as 	Gus
 Holger Höglund as 	Holger
 Karl-Arne Holmsten as 	John
 Georg Rydeberg as 	Georg Regin
 Bibi Nyström as 	Linda
 Gunnar Olsson as Professor Planius
 Birgitta Andersson as 	Vera
 Git Gay as Elegant lady
 Ulf Johansson as 	Police Commissioner
 Olof Thunberg as 	Villain
 Gustaf Färingborg as 	Jealous Husband
 Siegfried Fischer as 	Hansson	
 Ulla-Bella Fridh as 	Maid

References

Bibliography 
 Wredlund, Bertil & Lindfors, Rolf . Långfilm i Sverige: 1950–1959. Proprius, 1979.

External links 
 

1954 films
Swedish comedy films
1954 comedy films
1950s Swedish-language films
Films directed by Börje Larsson
Swedish black-and-white films
1950s Swedish films